Alim Nabiev (born October 10, 1994) is an Azerbaijani kickboxer, who has been professionally competing since 2010. He is the former WMC World Light Heavyweight champion.

He is ranked as the third best welterweight in the world by Combat Press as of September 2022, and the best by Beyond Kick as of October 2022. He was ranked in the welterweight top ten by Combat Press between November 2017 and July 2021, peaking as high as #2.

Martial arts career
Nabiev made his professional debut against Vladislav Savotchenko in October 2010. He lost the fight by an extra round decision. He would go on to amass a 6–3 record, before taking part in the 2012 Grand Prix Russia welterweight tournament. He knocked out Valentin Ribalko in the first round in the semifinal bout, and won a decision against Denis Larchenko in the final.

After winning four of his next five fights, with the sole loss being to Chingiz Allazov, Nabiev participated in the W5 Fighter Bratislava XX welterweight tournament. He beat Tevfik Sucu by decision in the semifinal, and Vladimir Konsky by decision in the finals.

After defeating William Diender and Adem Bozkurt, he took part in the 2013 Legend Fighting Show tournament. Despite winning the semifinal fight against Vyacheslav Borshev by decision, he would be knocked out by Dzhabar Askerov in the finals. Five months later, he also participated in the Grand Prix Russia Open tournament. He won the first two fights against Janne Ollonen and Sergey Kulyaba by decision, and the final fight against Deo Phetsangkhat by a second-round knockout.

Following his tournament win, Nabiev defeated Armen Petrosyan and Chad Sugden, before losing a decision to Masoud Rahimi. He went on to win eight fights in a row, culminating in a decision victory against Islam Murtazaev, which qualified him for the Kunlun Fight 75 kg tournament. He lost the quarterfinal fight against Diogo Calado by unanimous decision.

In October 2016, Nabiev challenged Vladimír Moravčík for the W5 European Muay thai 77 kg title. He beat Moravčík by unanimous decision. At Nuit des Champions 2016, Nabiev fought Yohan Lidon for the WMC World Light Heavyweight championship, and won the fight by unanimous decision.

He signed with Glory in the second part of 2017, and faced Jimmy Vienot at Glory 47: Lyon for his promotional debut. He won the fight by unanimous decision. He next faced Nieky Holzken at Glory 49: Rotterdam, and won by unanimous decision. After winning a split decision against Cedric Doumbe, he was given the chance to fight Harut Grigorian for the Glory Welterweight championship at Glory 54: Birmingham. Grigorian won by unanimous decision.

Nabiev fought Eyevan Danenberg at Glory 59: Amsterdam and won by split decision. He won another split decision against Murthel Groenhart at Glory 64: Strasbourg, and challenged Cedric Doumbe for the Glory Welterweight title at Glory 66: Paris. Doumbe won by a second-round knockout.

Nabiev was scheduled to face Troy Jones at Glory: Collision 3 on October 23, 2021. He won the fight by unanimous decision.

Nabiev faced Endy Semeleer for the vacant Glory Welterweight Championship at Glory 82 on November 19, 2022. He lost the fight by split decision.

Titles
2016 WMC World Light Heavyweight -79 kg Champion 
2016 W5 European Muay Thai -77 kg Champion 
2013 Grand Prix Russia Open -70 kg Tournament Champion
2013 Legend Fighting Show -71 kg Tournament Runner Up 
2013 W5 -71 kg Tournament Champion 
2013 IFMA European Championship -71kg 
2012 Grand Prix Russia Open Tournament Champion

Fight record

|-  style="background:#fbb;"
| 2022-11-19 || Loss ||align=left| Endy Semeleer || Glory 82 || Bonn, Germany || Decision (Split) || 5 || 3:00 
|-
! style=background:white colspan=9 |
|-
|-  style="background:#cfc"
| 2022-09-10 || Win ||align=left| Andrei Ostrovanu || Mix Fight Championship || Baku, Azerbaijan || Decision (Unanimous) || 3 || 3:00

|-  style="background:#cfc"
| 2021-10-23|| Win ||align=left| Troy Jones || Glory: Collision 3 || Arnhem, Netherlands || Decision (Unanimous) || 3 || 3:00
|-
|-  style="background:#FFBBBB;"
| 2019-06-22 || Loss ||align=left| Cedric Doumbe || Glory 66: Paris || Paris, France || KO (Punches)  || 2 || 2:48 
|-
! style=background:white colspan=9 |
|-  style="background:#CCFFCC"
| 2019-03-09 || Win||align=left| Murthel Groenhart || Glory 64: Strasbourg  || Strasbourg, France || Decision (Split) || 3 || 3:00
|- style="background:#CCFFCC"
| 2018-09-29 || Win ||align=left| Eyevan Danenberg || Glory 59: Amsterdam || Amsterdam, Netherlands || Decision (Split) || 3 || 3:00
|-
|-  bgcolor="FFBBBB"
| 2018-06-02 || Loss ||align=left| Harut Grigorian || Glory 54: Birmingham || Birmingham, England || Decision (Unanimous) || 5 || 3:00
|-
! style="background:white" colspan=9 |
|-
|-  style="background:#CCFFCC"
| 2018-03-03 || Win ||align=left| Cedric Doumbe || Glory 51: Rotterdam || Rotterdam, Netherlands || Decision (split) || 3 || 3:00
|-
|-  style="background:#CCFFCC"
| 2017-12-09 || Win ||align=left| Nieky Holzken || Glory 49: Rotterdam || Rotterdam, Netherlands || Decision (unanimous) || 3 || 3:00
|-
|-  style="background:#CCFFCC"
| 2017-10-28 || Win ||align=left| Jimmy Vienot|| Glory 47: Lyon || Lyon, France || Decision (unanimous) || 3 || 3:00
|-
|-  style="background:#CCFFCC"
| 2017-06-24 || Win ||align=left| Zhang Yang || Kunlun Fight 63  || Sanya, China || Decision (Unanimous) || 3 || 3:00
|-
|-  bgcolor="#CCFFCC" 
| 2016-11-19 || Win ||align=left| Yohan Lidon || Nuit des Champions 2016 || Marseille, France || Decision (unanimous) || 5 || 3:00
|-
! style=background:white colspan=9 |
|-
|-  bgcolor="#CCFFCC"
|2016-10-08 || Win ||align=left| Vladimír Moravčík || W5 Grand Prix "Legends in Prague" || Prague, Czech Republic || Decision (Unanimous) || 5 || 3:00
|-
! style=background:white colspan=9 |
|-
|-  bgcolor="#FFBBBB"
| 2016-07-10|| Loss ||align=left| Diogo Calado|| Kunlun Fight 47, 75 kg Tournament Quarter-Finals 3 || Nanjing, China || Decision (Unanimous) || 3 || 3:00
|-
|-  bgcolor="#CCFFCC"
| 2016-04-08 || Win ||align=left| Islam Murtazaev || Kunlun Fight 41, 75 kg Tournament Final 16 || Xining, China || Decision (Unanimous) || 3 || 3:00
|-
|-  bgcolor="#CCFFCC"
| 2016-02-27 || Win ||align=left| Jamie Bates || ACB KB 5 || Orel, Russia || Decision (unanimous) || 3 || 3:00
|-
|-  bgcolor="#CCFFCC"
|2015-11-13 || Win ||align=left| Masoud Rahimi || ACB KB 4: Grand Prix Final || Perm, Russia || Decision || 3 || 3:00
|-
|-  bgcolor="#CCFFCC"
| 2015-10-10 || Win ||align=left| Patrick Madis || Golden BARS Championship 2015 || Belgorod, Russia || Decision || 5 || 3:00
|-  bgcolor="#CCFFCC"
| 2015-08-15 || Win ||align=left| Pavel Turuk || Battle in Sochi/Kunlun Fight 29 || Sochi, Russia || TKO (Cut) || 2 || 
|-
|-  bgcolor="#CCFFCC"
| 2015-07-01 || Win ||align=left| Li Baoming || T-One || Beijing, China ||  ||  || 
|-
|-  bgcolor="#CCFFCC"
| 2015-06-18 || Win ||align=left| Pawel Biszczak || Grand Prix Russia Open 17 || Russia || Decision (Unanimous) || 3 || 3:00
|-
|-  bgcolor="#CCFFCC"
| 2015-02-26 || Win ||align=left| Kumar Zhaliev || Grand Prix Russia Open 16 || Moscow, Russia || TKO || 3 ||
|-  bgcolor="#CCFFCC"
| 2014-12-19 || Win ||align=left| Jamal Yusupov || Tvoy Vykhod || Lyubertsy, Russia || Decision || 3 || 3:00
|-
|-  bgcolor="#FFBBBB"
| 2014-12-07 || Loss ||align=left| Masoud Rahimi || Tatneft Cup 2015 – 1st selection 1/8 final || Kazan, Rusia || Decision (Unanimous) || 3 || 3:00
|-
|-  bgcolor="#CCFFCC"
| 2014-04-05 || Win ||align=left| Armen Petrosyan || Legend 3: Pour Homme || Milan, Italy || Decision (Unanimous) || 3 || 3:00
|-
|-  bgcolor="#CCFFCC"
| 2014-02-23 || Win ||align=left| Chad Sugden || K-1 World max Final 4|| Baku, Azerbaijan || Decision (Split) || 3 || 3:00
|-
|-  bgcolor="#CCFFCC"
| 2013-11-16 || Win ||align=left| Armen Petrosyan || W5 Grand Prix Orel XXII || Oryol, Russia || Decision (Unanimous) || 3 || 3:00
|-
|-  bgcolor= "#CCFFCC"
| 2013-10-03 || Win ||align=left| Deo Phetsangkhat || Grand Prix Russia Open, Final || Russia || KO || 2 ||    
|-
! style=background:white colspan=9 |
|-
|-  bgcolor= "#CCFFCC"
| 2013-10-03 || Win ||align=left| Sergey Kulyaba || Grand Prix Russia Open, Semi Finals || Russia || Decision (Unanimous) || 3 ||  3:00   
|-
|-  bgcolor= "#CCFFCC"
| 2012-10-03 || Win ||align=left| Janne Ollonen || Grand Prix Russia Open, Quarter Finals || Russia || Decision (Unanimous) || 3 ||  3:00   
|-
|-  bgcolor="#FFBBBB"
| 2013-05-25 || Loss ||align=left| Dzhabar Askerov || Legend Fighting Show, Final || Moscow, Russia || KO (Left low kick) || 3 || 1:32
|-
! style=background:white colspan=9 |
|-
|-  bgcolor="#CCFFCC"
| 2013-05-25 || Win ||align=left| Vyacheslav Borshev || Legend Fighting Show, Semi Finals || Moscow, Russia ||  Decision (Unanimous)|| 3 || 3:00
|-
|-  bgcolor="#CCFFCC"
| 2013-05-13 || Win ||align=left| Adem Bozkurt || Land of Fire || Vienna, Austria ||  KO || 1 || 
|-
|-  bgcolor="#CCFFCC"
| 2013-04-27 || Win || align=left| William Diender || W5 Grand Prix Orel XXI || Oryol, Russia ||  Decision (Unanimous)|| 3 || 3:00
|-
|-  bgcolor="#CCFFCC"
| 2013-03-16 || Win || align=left| Vladimir Konsky || W5 Fighter Bratislava XX, Final || Bratislava, Slovakia ||  Decision || 3 || 3:00
|-
! style=background:white colspan=9 |
|-
|-  bgcolor="#CCFFCC"
| 2013-03-16 || Win || align=left| Tevfik Sucu || W5 Fighter Bratislava XX, Semi Finals || Bratislava, Slovakia ||  Decision|| 3 || 3:00
|-
|-  bgcolor= "#FFBBBB"
| 2013-02-22 || Loss ||align=left| Chingiz Allazov || Knockout Show || Moscow, Russia || Decision (Unanimous) || 3 ||  3:00   
|-
|-  bgcolor= "#CCFFCC"
| 2012-12-23 || Win ||align=left| Stanislav Kazantcev || W5 Fighter Moscow XVIII || Moscow, Russia || Decision (Unanimous) || 3 ||  3:00   
|-
|-  bgcolor= "#CCFFCC"
| 2012-11-29 || Win ||align=left| Ivan Babachenko || W5 Fighter Moscow XVII || Moscow, Russia || Decision (Unanimous) || 3 ||  3:00   
|-
|-  bgcolor= "#CCFFCC"
| 2012-11-24 || Win ||align=left| Vasilis Kakarikos || Extreme Fighting || Thessaloniki, Greece || TKO || 3 ||
|-  bgcolor= "#CCFFCC"
| 2012-11-08 || Win ||align=left| Vladimir Shulyak || W5 Fighter Moscow XVI || Moscow, Russia || Decision (Unanimous) || 3 ||  3:00   
|-
|-  bgcolor= "#CCFFCC"
| 2012-10-20 || Win ||align=left| Denis Larchenko || Grand Prix Russia Open, Final || Russia || Decision (Unanimous) || 3 ||  3:00   
|-
! style=background:white colspan=9 |
|-
|-  bgcolor= "#CCFFCC"
| 2012-10-20 || Win ||align=left| Valentin Ribalko || Grand Prix Russia Open, Semi Finals || Russia ||  KO (Knee)|| 1 ||    
|-
|-  bgcolor= "#CCFFCC"
| 2012-08-24 || Win ||align=left| Alka Matewa || W5 Fighter Moscow XIII || Moscow, Russia ||  Decision || 3 ||  3:00  
|-
|-  bgcolor= "#CCFFCC"
| 2012-02-24 || Win ||align=left| Ivan Busarov || W5 Fighter Moscow X || Moscow, Russia ||  KO || 2 || 
|-
|-  bgcolor= "#CCFFCC"
| 2012-01-21 || Win ||align=left| Elkun Orudzhev || Corona Cup 16 || Russia || Decision (Split) || 3 ||  3:00  
|-
|-  bgcolor="#CCFFCC" 
| 2011-10-22 ||  Win ||align=left| Aziz Kallah || W5 Grand Prix Moscow|| Moscow, Russia || Decision (Split) || 3 || 3:00
|-  bgcolor= "#cfc"
| 2011-09-02 || Win ||align=left| Kirill Marchenko || W5 Grand Prix  || Poltava, Ukraine || TKO || 3 ||
|-  bgcolor= "#fbb"
| 2011-04-09 || Loss||align=left| Vyacheslav Borschev || W5 Grand Prix "KO" || Moscow, Russia || Decision || 3 ||  3:00
|-  bgcolor= "#fbb"
| 2011-02-23 || Loss||align=left| Ruslan Kushnirenko ||  || Odessa, Ukraine || Decision || 3 ||  3:00
|-  bgcolor= "#cfc"
| 2010-11-27 || Win||align=left| Vladislav Morgulets ||  || Kiev, Ukraine || Ext.R Decision || 4 ||  3:00
|-  bgcolor= "#fbb"
| 2010-10-04 || Loss||align=left| Vladislav Savotchenko ||  || Yalta, Russia || Ext.R Decision || 4 ||  3:00  
|-
|-
| colspan=9 | Legend:    

|-  style="background:#fbb;"
| 2014-05-04 || Loss ||align=left| Thongchai Sitsongpeenong || 2014 IFMA World Championships, 1/8 Final|| Langkawi, Malaysia || Decision || 3 || 3:00
|-  style="background:#FBB;"
| 2013-07-|| Loss ||align=left| Vitaly Gurkov || 2013 IFMA European Championship, Final || Lisbon, Portugal || Decision  || 4 || 2:00
|-
! style=background:white colspan=8 |
|-
| colspan=9 | Legend:

See also
 List of K-1 events
 List of K-1 champions
 List of male kickboxers

References

External links
Profile at Muaythaitv.com

1994 births
Living people
Azerbaijani male kickboxers
Ukrainian male kickboxers
Ukrainian Muay Thai practitioners
Kunlun Fight kickboxers